The Royal Air Squadron (RAS) is a flying club in the United Kingdom founded in 1966 by Peter Vanneck, the Hon. Hugh Astor and Anthony Cayzer - friends who shared a passionate interest in flying light aircraft. Prince Philip was the Squadron's Air Commodore. Two of the earliest members were Second World War heroes Sir Douglas Bader and Hugh Dundas. Others included Sir Max Aitkin, Tommy Sopwith, Kenneth McAlpine, John Houlder and Lord Waterpark.

The RAS was founded as "The Air Squadron" in 1966. In 2016 the association was granted the right to use the title "Royal".

The RAS has gone on various group flights in several countries - including:
Russia, Jordan, Tanzania, USA, Pakistan, South Africa, Serbia, Ukraine.

The RAS sponsors several awards, listed as follows by the awarding institution.

British Aerobatic Association:
The Air Squadron Trophy.

Royal Air Force Air Cadets:
The Air Squadron Trophy: Awarded annually to the Best RAF Section participating in the Ground Training Competition.
The Sir John Thomson (RAF) Memorial Sword.
The Geoffrey de Havilland Flying Foundation Medal for CCF Achievement.

South African Air Force
The Air Squadron Sword of Honour is awarded every six months to the top officer cadet.

United States Air Force:
The Air Squadron Millennium Sword of Friendship. The sword is kept in the Pentagon and awarded to the top Air Force cadet each year.

See also
 Royal Yacht Squadron
 Royal Automobile Club

References

External links
Official website

Aviation organisations based in the United Kingdom
Organizations established in 1966
Organisations based in the United Kingdom with royal patronage
1966 establishments in the United Kingdom